No. 5 Branch is a rural locality in the Cassowary Coast Region, Queensland, Australia.

Geography 
The locality is bounded to the south and east by Liverpool Creek (which ultimately flows into the Coral Sea at Cowley Beach / Kurramine Beach).

The land use in the south and east of the locality is growing sugarcane and bananas. The land use in the north-western part of the locality is grazing on native vegetation.

History
In the  the population of the locality was 9 people.

Education
There are no schools in the locality. The nearest primary school is Silkwood State School in neighbouring Silkwood to the south. The nearest secondary schools are Tully State High School in Tully to the south and Innsifail State College in Innisfail Estate in Innisfail to the north.

References 

Cassowary Coast Region
Localities in Queensland